Joko Susilo (born 10 January 1996) is an Indonesian professional footballer. who plays as a defender for Liga 1 club Arema.

Club career

Early career
Joko started his football career Persekap Pasuruan. Then, Joko had time to strengthen PSMS Medan at the Liga 2.

Arema
On 21 January 2023, Joko joined a Liga 1 club Arema. Joko made his first-team debut on 12 February 2023 as a substitute in a match against Persija Jakarta at the Patriot Stadium, Bekasi.

References

Football in Indonesia
Footballers in Indonesia
Liga 1 (Indonesia) players
Indonesian footballers
Arema F.C. players